Hans Peter Nooteboom (1934–2022) was a Dutch botanist, pteridologist, plant taxonomist, and journal editor.

Biography
Born in the Dutch East Indies, Hans Nooteboom with his family returned in 1939 to the Netherlands, where he remained during WWII. After graduation from secondary school in Rotterdam, he studied biology at Leiden University. There he studied under van Steenis and Robert Hegnauer and graduated with MSc. After six years as a secondary school teacher, Nooteboom become a graduate student at Leiden University in Hegnauer's Laboratory of Experimental Plant Systematics. In 1975 Nooteboom graduated with a Ph.D. on Symplocaceae of the Old World. In 1976 he became a staff member of the Rijksherbarium, as successor to Johannes Hendrikus Kern (1903–1974). Nooteboom established an international reputation as a plant taxonomist.

He has been an editor for Flora Malesiana since 1999 and has also done editorial work for Blumea and the Flora Malesiana Bulletin. As a collector for the Rijksherbarium (merged in 1999 into the National Herbarium of the Netherlands), he has made trips to "Ambon, the Andaman Islands, Aru, Kalimantan (several times), Sumatra, Sabah, Sarawak, Peninsular Malaysia, Singapore, Burma, Pakistan, China, The Philippines, Indonesia, Malaysia, Ceylon and China".

Selected publications
 Nooteboom, HP; JE Vidal, A Aubréville, JF Leroy. 1977. Flore du Cambodge, du Laos et du Viêt-Nam. publ. Muséum national d'histoire naturelle. 75 pp. 
 Report of the 1982-1983 Bukit Raya expedition. publ. Rijksherbarium, Leiden
 Davalliaceae. publ. ETI, Expert Center for Taxonomic Identification, University of Amsterdam. 
 Berg, CC; EJH Corner, HP Nooteboom. Flora Malesiana : being an illustrated systematic account of the Malesian flora, including keys for determination, diagnostic descriptions, references to the literature, synonymy and distribution and notes on the ecology of its wild and commonly cultivate. publ. Nationaal Herbarium Nederland, Leiden. 730 pp. + CD
 Revision of the symplocaceae of the old world, New Caledonia excepted. publ. Universitaire Pers, Leiden. 30 pp. 
 What Should Botanists Do with Their Time?. 1988. Taxon 37(1): 134.

Eponymns
 (Elaeocarpaceae) Elaeocarpus nooteboomii Coode
 (Euphorbiaceae) Bridelia nooteboomii Chakrab.
 (Lauraceae) Cinnamomum nooteboomii Kosterm.

References

External links

1934 births
Living people
Leiden University alumni
20th-century Dutch botanists
Pteridologists
Dutch pteridologists
21st-century Dutch botanists
People from East Nusa Tenggara